The Speaker of the Legislative Assembly of New Brunswick is the presiding officer of the provincial legislature. Since 1994 the position has been elected by MLAs using a secret ballot. Previously, the Speaker had been appointed by motion of the house, in practice moved by the Premier of New Brunswick usually after consultation with the Leader of the Opposition. Shirley Dysart was the first Speaker to be elected by his or her peers.

The Speaker is usually a member of the governing party. The only recent exceptions have been Robert McCready and Michael Malley. McCready was appointed by motion of Premier Richard Hatfield following the close election of 1978. Hatfield's Progressive Conservative Party had won only 30 seats compared to the 28 seats won by the opposition Liberal Party. McCready was a member of the Liberal caucus and was appointed over the objection of the Liberal Party. The Liberal opposition argued on a point of order before the clerk of the assembly that precedent required that the opposition support the motion appointing speaker, but the clerk allowed the motion to be put and carried by the government. Malley was elected in 2006 while sitting as an independent. Malley had left the government caucus following a cabinet shuffle that had seen the incumbent speaker, Bev Harrison, join the cabinet leaving the post vacant. Malley argued that he should have been included in the cabinet for regional reasons and left the government caucus in protest; to prevent losing control of the legislature in a tenuous minority government situation, the Progressive Conservative caucus supported Malley as speaker. Malley later changed his party affiliation, amid some controversy, back to that of the governing Progressive Conservatives while occupying the speakership.

Speakers since the creation of the Assembly in 1785
Bill Oliver (2020–Present)
Daniel Guitard (2018–2020)
 Chris Collins (2014–2018)
 Dale Graham (2010–2014)
Roy Boudreau (2007–2010)
Eugene McGinley (2007)
Michael Malley (2006)
Bev Harrison (1999–2006)
John McKay (1998–1999)
Danny Gay (1995–1998)
Shirley Dysart (1994–1995)
Gérald Clavette (1994)
Shirley Dysart (1991–1994)
Frank Branch (1987–1991)
Charles Gallagher (1986–1987)
James Tucker (1981–1985)
Robert McCready (1979–1980)
William Woodroffe (1973–1978)
Lawrence Garvie (1971–1973)
Robert McCready (1968–1970)
H. H. Williamson (1966–1967)
Bernard A. Jean (1963–1966)
Ernest Richard (1960–1963)
J. Arthur Moore (1955–1960)
Walter Powers (1954)
E.T. Kennedy (1953)
Harry O. Downey (1945–1952)
Frederic McGrand (April 4, 1940 – July 10, 1944)
Hedley Francis Gregory Bridges (1936–1938)
F. C. Squires (1931–1935)
Joseph Leonard O'Brien (August 1925 – June 1930)
A. Allison Dysart (1921–1925)
Judson E. Hetherington (1919–1920)
William Currie (1917–1918)
Olivier-Maximin Melanson (1916–1917)
Walter B. Dickson (1914–1916)
George Johnson Clarke (1909–1914)
Donald Morrison (1908)
Charles J. Osman (1907–1908)
Clifford William Robinson (February 28, 1901 – February 5, 1903) & (March 26, 1903 – April 13, 1907)
 J.P. Burchill (1893–1899)
 Albert S. White (1890–1892)
 William Pugsley (1887–1889)
 James E. Lynott (1883–1886)
 Benjamin Robert Stephenson (1879–1882)
 William Wedderburn (1875–1878)
 Edwin Arnold Vail (1871–1874)
 Bliss Botsford (1867–1870)
 John H. Gray (1866–1867)
 Edwin Arnold Vail (1865–1866)
 John Campbell Allen (1863–1865)
 John Mercer Johnson (1859–1863)
 James A. Harding (1857–1858)
 Charles Simonds (1856–1857)
 Daniel Hanington (1853–1856)
 William Crane (1852–1853)
 Charles Simonds (1851)
 John Wesley Weldon (1843–1850)
 Charles Simonds (1835–1841)
 William Crane (1831–1835)
 Charles Simonds (1829–1831)
 Richard Simonds (1828)
 Harry Peters (1826–1827)
 Ward Chipman, Jr. (1824–1825)
 William Botsford (1817–1823)
 John Robinson (1813–1816)
 Amos Botsford (1786–1812)

References 
 The Evolving Speakership, Canadian Parliamentary Review

Politics of New Brunswick
New Brunswick